Lomaso (Lomàs in local dialect) was a comune (municipality) in Trentino in the Italian region Trentino-Alto Adige/Südtirol. On January 1, 2010 it merged, with Bleggio Inferiore, in the new municipality of Comano Terme.

Geography
The former municipality contained the frazioni (subdivisions, mainly villages and hamlets) of Campo Lomaso (municipal seat, also named Lomaso), Comano, Dasindo, Godenzo, Lundo, Poia, Ponte Arche and Vigo Lomaso.

Lomaso, located about 20 km southwest of Trento, bordered with the following municipalities: San Lorenzo in Banale, Stenico, Dorsino, Calavino, Bleggio Inferiore, Dro, Fiavè, Arco and Tenno.

Demographic evolution
As of 31 December 2004, it had a population of 1,482 and an area of 41.5 km².

References

External links
 Comano Terme official website
Coat of arms of Lomaso

Frazioni of Trentino
Former municipalities of Trentino